Ramona is an 1884 novel by Helen Hunt Jackson.

Ramona may also refer to:

Arts and entertainment 
 Adaptations of Jackson's novel:
 Ramona (1910 film), directed by D. W. Griffith
 Ramona (1916 film), directed by Donald Crisp
 Ramona (1928 film), directed by Edwin Carewe
 Ramona (1936 film), directed by Henry King
 Ramona (1946 film), directed by Victor Urruchua 
 Ramona (2000 TV series), a Mexican telenovela
 The Ramona Pageant, a 1923 annual outdoor play depicting Jackson's novel
 Ramona (novel series), by Beverly Cleary
 Ramona (1988 TV series), a Canadian series based on Cleary's novels, starring Sarah Polley 
 Ramona Quimby, the title character of Cleary's books
 Ramona (1961 film), a 1961 West German musical film directed by Paul Martin
 "Ramona" (1928 song), a popular song from the 1928 film
 "Ramona" (Dragon song), a 1982 song by Australian-New Zealand band Dragon
 "Ramona", a song by Guster from Keep It Together
 "Ramona", a song by The Ramones from Rocket to Russia
 "To Ramona", a song by Bob Dylan from Another Side of Bob Dylan. (1964)
 Ramona (2003 TV series), a Swedish miniseries starring Björn Bengtsson
 Ramona (computer program), a fictional computer avatar created by Ray Kurzweil
 SS Ramona, a fictional ship in the Tintin comic The Red Sea Sharks
 Ramona Films, movie production company for the film The Disaster Artist (film)

People 
 Ramona (vocalist) (1909–1972), American 1930s cabaret singer and pianist
 Ramona Band of Cahuilla Indians, in Riverside County, California, U.S.
 Comandante Ramona (died 2006), Mexican guerrilla leader of the Zapatista Army of National Liberation (EZLN)

Places 
 Ramona, Los Angeles County, California, an unincorporated community named after Jackson's novel
 Ramona, San Diego County, California, an unincorporated community also named after Jackson's novel
 Ramona Valley AVA, California wine region in San Diego County
 Ramona Airport
 Ramona, Kansas
 Ramona, Oklahoma, a town named after Jackson's novel
 Ramona, South Dakota

Highways 
 The San Bernardino Freeway, formerly called the Ramona Freeway.
 Ramona Boulevard, a long street in Los Angeles County.

Other uses 
 Ramona (name), a given name
 Ramona (sternwheeler 1892), a North American river vessel
 Ramona passive sensor, a Czech passive sensor system

See also 
 Ramona High School (disambiguation)